Park Ho-san (박호산; born October 18, 1972; birth name Park Jung-hwan (박정환)), is a South Korean actor who is known for his performances on the screen and stage. He has appeared in various film and television projects, as well as in numerous stage productions. In particular, during his two decades of acting, Park Ho-san performed heavy performances on stage such as 'Suck' (2008), 'In the Heights' (2015), 'Chuncheon There' (2009, 2015), 'Waiting for Heroes' (2013), 'Frozen' (2015), and 'The Book of a Thief' (2015).

He is notable for his supporting roles in television series like Prison Playbook, My Mister, Lawless Lawyer and The Penthouse: War in Life.

Career
Born in Seoul, Park first interested in acting after he saw play Hamlet. When Park entered Baejae High School in Seoul, he decided that he wanted to major in acting. He made a theater club with his friends. He went to the theater and office of Seoul Yejeon (now Seoul University of the Arts) with his two friends to find drama class instructor of our school.

Park enrolled at the Department of Theater and Film Park at Chung-Ang University. In 1993 he became member of the Yeonwoo Theater Company. and made his debut in the play 'Winter Wanderer' in 1996. In 1997, Park started acting in big screen with a small role in film Black Jack. In 1998, he continued to act in minor roles in four films, Story of Man, Saturday, 2:00 pm! Soul Guardians and A Mystery of the Cube.

In 2001, Park appeared in feature film Wanee & Junah.

In 2013, Park acted opposite Bae Hae-sun in Kim Min-jung musical Eric Satie. Park Ho-san acted as Eric Satie, French composer and pianist. Directed by Park Hye-sun, it was held from November 22 to December 1, 2013 at the Grand Theater of Daehakro Arts Theater in Dongsung-dong, Seoul.

In 2014, Park starred in feature film The King of Jokgu. His next film are 'The Great Army' (2017), 'The Deokmo: The Age of Rebellion' (2017), and 'Theselfish Man' (2017), and was active in plays and musicals. 

Park started with tvN's drama Liar Game (2014). In 2015, He was back onstage and starred as painter Lee Jung-seop in musical Myeongdong Romance. Also acted in several plays, included 'In the Heights' (2015), 'Chuncheon There' (2015), 'Frozen' (2015), and 'The Book of a Thief' (2015). 

in 206 SBS 'Wonted' (2016) and followed by 'The Defendant' (2017). In 2017, Park impressed in his supporting role in the drama series Prison Playbook, as Kang Chul-doo (aka "KAIST" of Mullae-dong. He has a severe lisp, which other inmates (especially Han-yang) make fun of. He is an engineer who was sentenced to 3 years and 6 months’ imprisonment because of a gambling scam. Directed by Shin Won-ho, Prison Playbook. Since then, Park gained momentum as actor. 

In 2018, Park was cast in drama My Mister as replacement of Oh Dal-su. His role as Park Sang-hoon, Dong-hoon's eldest brother. He is a middle-aged man who was fired from his job and then ran two failing businesses, which ended up in him being chased out of his own home. Though he has to live under his mother's roof, he's a romanticist at heart who always thinks about ways to find happiness. His performance received favorable reviews.

Park is a member of Man Theater, a theater company.

Personal life
Park was also married with three sons, including rapper Park Joon-ho. His wife is theater actress Kim Dong-hwa, who is eight years younger than him.

Filmography

Film

Television series

Web series

Stage

Musical

Theater

Awards and nominations

Notes

References

External links
 
 
 

1972 births
Living people
20th-century South Korean male actors
21st-century South Korean male actors
South Korean male television actors
South Korean male film actors
South Korean male stage actors